Cerura menciana is a moth of the  family Notodontidae. It is found in Japan, Korea, China, Burma and Taiwan.

The wingspan is 50–60 mm.

The larvae have been recorded feeding on Populus species.

Subspecies
Cerura menciana menciana (China)
Cerura menciana birmanica Bryk, 1949 (Burma)
Cerura menciana formosana Matsumura, 1929 (Taiwan)

References

Notodontidae
Moths described in 1877
Moths of Asia
Moths of Japan
Moths of Korea
Moths of Taiwan